Deadliest Sea is a 2009 Canadian made-for-television film directed by T. J. Scott. It is about the crew of the Kodiak, Alaska-based scallop fishing vessel St. Christopher. It was produced by the producers of the popular Discovery Channel series Deadliest Catch, and originally aired on the Discovery Channel on July 19, 2009. While the film itself is a fictionalized account, according to a title-card at the beginning it is based on a true story.

Discovery's description of the film called it "a thrilling tale of struggle and survival in the fierce open sea."

Plot

Cast
 Sebastian Pigott as Tommy
 Joanne Boland as Vanessa
 Ryan Blakely as Reed
 Kristen Holden-Ried as "Bear"
 Eugene Clark as Moss
 Ron White as Burns
 Greg Bryk as Stubbs
 Peter Outerbridge as Captain Colvin
 Jonathan Walker as Denton 
 Doug Lennox as The Pilot
 John Blackwood as Harry
 Daniel Kash as Marty
 Daniel DeSanto as The Greenhorn 
 Danny Smith as Ensign Mac

References

External links
 Discovery Channel schedule
 

2009 television films
2009 films
Discovery Channel (Canada) original programming
English-language Canadian films
Canadian television films
Films directed by T. J. Scott
Films scored by Andrew Lockington
Films set on ships
Seafaring films based on actual events
2000s English-language films
2000s Canadian films